Béla Békessy (16 November 1875 – 6 July 1916) was a Hungarian épée, foil and sabre fencer. He won a silver medal in the individual sabre event at the 1912 Summer Olympics. He was killed in action during World War I.

See also
 List of Olympians killed in World War I

References

External links
 

1875 births
1916 deaths
Austro-Hungarian military personnel killed in World War I
Hungarian male épée fencers
Hungarian male foil fencers
Hungarian male sabre fencers
Olympic fencers of Hungary
Fencers at the 1912 Summer Olympics
Olympic silver medalists for Hungary
Sportspeople from Debrecen
Olympic medalists in fencing
Medalists at the 1912 Summer Olympics
Sportspeople from the Austro-Hungarian Empire